Earache: Extreme Metal Racing is a budget Vehicular Combat title from UK developer Data Design Interactive and Metro 3D. It incorporates an Extreme metal music soundtrack from artists signed on the Earache Records record label as players race. It has been released on the PC and PlayStation 2. The PC version of the game was packaged in an Earache Compilation set called Worldwide Metal.

Game Modes 
Single Race - Single race offers straightforward competitive action on any of the tracks.

Time Trial - The player races against their own previous times on a map.

Challenge - A series of 3 successive races. After each race, points are awarded according to the finished position. The player with the most points at the end is the tournament winner.

Death Match - Free-for-all deathmatch. Each player has 3 lives and once they have been destroyed, they are removed from the game.

Zombie Massacre - Players compete to destroy zombies.

Death Race - To win, all competitors must be destroyed before they complete a lap of the track.

References

External links
 Worldwide Metal

2006 video games
PlayStation 2 games
PlayStation Portable games
Video games developed in the United Kingdom
Windows games
Vehicular combat games
Metro3D games
Data Design Interactive games